The Mayor of Ajaccio is the head of Ajaccio City Council. The Mayor is an elected politician who, along with the 49 members of Ajaccio City Council, is responsible for the strategic government of the city of Ajaccio, Corsica.

The current Mayor is Laurent Marcangeli, elected on 8 February 2015.

Mayors of Ajaccio

See also 
 Ajaccio
 Municipal council
 Municipal elections in France
 Mayor

References

External links 
 List of mayors of Ajaccio on the site of FranceGenWeb
 Website of Ajaccio Town Hall

Ajaccio
Mayors